Nestor Falls Water Aerodrome  is located adjacent to Nestor Falls, Ontario, Canada.

See also
 Nestor Falls Airport
 Nestor Falls/Sabaskong Bay Water Aerodrome

References

Registered aerodromes in Kenora District
Seaplane bases in Ontario